Euryomyrtus inflata is a shrub endemic to Western Australia.

It blooms between June and July producing white-pink flowers followed by erect fruits.

It is found on flat plains in the Mid West region of Western Australia between Sandstone, Meekatharra and Wiluna where it grows in deep red sandy soils.

References

Eudicots of Western Australia
inflata
Endemic flora of Western Australia
Plants described in 2001
Taxa named by Malcolm Eric Trudgen